Atonement is the tenth studio album by American death metal band Immolation. It was released on February 24, 2017, through Nuclear Blast Records.

Reception

Atonement received universal acclaim from critics. At Metacritic (a review aggregator site which assigns a normalized rating out of 100 from music critics), based on 5 critics, the album has received a score of 82/100, which indicates "Universal acclaim". Serena Cherry of Terrorizer called Atonement "one of the greatest albums of their career", being "packed with exactly the kind of mind-bogglingly intricate guitar work, meticulous song writing and guttural satanic growls that we have come to expect."
Exclaim! ranked the album at number 8 on their list of Top 10 Metal and Hardcore Albums
of 2017.

Track listing

Personnel
Immolation
 Ross Dolan – bass, vocals
 Robert Vigna – lead guitar
 Alex Bouks – rhythm guitar
 Steve Shalaty – drums

Technical
 Zack Ohren – mixing, mastering
 Pär Olofsson – cover art
 Paul Orofino – production
 Zbigniew Bielak – additional artwork
 Rob Kimura – layout

References

2017 albums
Immolation (band) albums
Nuclear Blast albums
Albums with cover art by Pär Olofsson